Farrah Abraham (born May 31, 1991) is an American reality television personality, singer, pornographic actress, and writer. Born in Omaha, Nebraska, and raised in Council Bluffs, Iowa, she received public attention after being cast in the reality television series 16 and Pregnant in 2009, which documented the pregnancies and first months of motherhood for several young women. Later that year, she was cast in the spin-off series Teen Mom, and appeared in each of its four seasons until its conclusion in 2012. That August, she released her debut studio album and first memoir, both of which were titled My Teenage Dream Ended. The book made it onto The New York Times bestseller list.

Early life
Farrah Abraham was born in Omaha, Nebraska, and raised in Council Bluffs, Iowa. Her father, Michael Abraham, is of Syrian and Italian descent. Her mother, Debra Danielsen, is of Danish and Sicilian ancestry. She grew up with her half-sister, Ashley Danielson.  Her parents divorced in 2010 and in 2017, her mother married David Merz.

Career

16 and Pregnant and Teen Mom
In 2008, Abraham, then 17, was selected to appear on the MTV show, 16 and Pregnant, a reality series that aimed to document the lives of pregnant teenagers across the United States. News of her pregnancy caused issues between her and her mother, Debra Danielsen, with Danielsen calling her daughter a whore and preventing her from obtaining an abortion; being pregnant, Abraham was forced to discontinue her cheerleading. Furthermore, during filming, Derek Underwood, the father of her child, died in a car accident. Abraham gave birth to the couple's daughter, Sophia Laurent Abraham, on February 23, 2009. Abraham's episode of 16 and Pregnant aired in 2009.

Later that year she was cast in the spin-off series Teen Mom; it followed Abraham, in addition to Maci Bookout, Catelynn Lowell and Amber Portwood, who also appeared on episodes of 16 and Pregnant, during their first years of motherhood. The series premiere was broadcast on December 8, 2009. Abraham and her mother are seen to have a rocky relationship throughout Teen Mom, with Danielson being charged with assault in an Iowa court for hitting her in January 2010. Abraham started seeing a therapist to discuss the rocky relationship with her family, because she couldn't cope with her mother's actions as well as dealing with her emotions regarding Sophia's father, Derek Underwood and his death. Farrah eventually proved to Derek's family through a paternity test that Derek was in fact Sophia's father and then was faced with a lawsuit filed by Derek's mother for grandparents' visitation rights, despite no previous contact with Sophia.

In 2011, she began attending the Art Institute of Fort Lauderdale in Florida, where she got an associate degree in culinary arts and management. She later launched the "Mom & Me" pasta sauce line.

On August 1, 2012, Abraham ventured into the music industry with the release of her debut studio album My Teenage Dream Ended. It received overwhelmingly negative reviews from contemporary music critics, but has since been reappraised as avant-garde outsider art. Abraham released a memoir by the same title on August 14. After airing four seasons, the series finale of Teen Mom aired on August 29, 2012.

In January 2014, Abraham was cast for the fourth season of Couples Therapy. However, Brian Dawe claimed that he was hired by Abraham to appear as her on-screen boyfriend and ultimately did not appear on the program alongside her. Abraham consequently became the only cast member in series history to continue therapy without a partner, and was refocused on repairing her relationship with her mother.

With her previous allegations of rape placing a strain on her partnership with Vivid Entertainment, a press release announcing her second sex tape Farrah 2: Backdoor and More in February stated: "it's no 'fake' 'leak'—it's the real, raw, ridiculous deal, and it suits Farrah's underhanded personality herself." Farrah reportedly earned $1 million selling her sex tape with James Deen. Later that month, Abraham appeared in the TV special Being Farrah, a continuation of Teen Mom; Bookout, Lowell, and Portwood were featured in the specials Being Maci, Being Catelynn, and Being Amber, respectively. Their successes prompted MTV to consider reviving the series without Abraham, who the other women were concerned was an inappropriate influence on their children.

In March 2014, Abraham returned to the music industry with the release of the song "Blowin'" and the simultaneous premiere of its accompanying music video. She stated that she treats music as a "hobby, not my career move." In August 2014, she signed a contract with Palazio's Gentleman's Club in Austin, Texas, for $544,000 for a residency until New Year's Eve.

In October 2017, Farrah was fired from the show by producer Morgan J. Freeman because of her work in the adult entertainment industry. She was later replaced by Bristol Palin and Cheyenne Floyd.

Big Brother
In 2015, Abraham appeared on the 16th series of the British television series Celebrity Big Brother, representing the United States. On September 18, she became the fifth housemate to be evicted. She was not in the top four highest-voted housemates, and her fellow housemate, Austin Armacost, chose to evict her. She had spent 23 days in the house.

On 22 September 2015, she appeared as a panelist on the Celebrity Big Brother's Bit on the Side after-show and got into a heated argument with fellow panelist, Aisleyne Horgan-Wallace. The show was taken off air 10 minutes early after a "clash" between panelists. Abraham and Janice Dickinson were given police cautions by Hertfordshire Police.

Personal life
In April 2021, Abraham filed a report to the Palm Beach Police Department accusing then Windsor, California mayor Dominic Foppoli of sexually assaulting her. The filing included photographs, video and audio provided by Abraham. The case is under criminal investigation as of May 2021. She is one of nine women to accuse Foppoli of sex crimes. Foppoli resigned within three hours of reporters asking him about her allegations.

In January 2022, Abraham was arrested after it was reported that she assaulted a nightclub security guard.

Filmography

Discography
Album
 My Teenage Dream Ended (2012)

Singles
 "Blowin" (2014)
 "Jingle Bell Rock" (featuring Sophia) (2020)

Published works
 My Teenage Dream Ended (2012)
 Passy Perfume (2012)
 Celebrity Sex Tape: In The Making (2014)
 Celebrity Sex Tape: The Secret's Out (2014)
 Celebrity Sex Tape: Love Through Limelight (2015)

References

External links
 
 
 
 
 Farrah Abraham

American pornographic film actresses
American autobiographers
Writers from Omaha, Nebraska
Writers from Austin, Texas
Actresses from Omaha, Nebraska
Actresses from Austin, Texas
Living people
Participants in American reality television series
American people of Syrian descent
American people of Italian descent
American people of Danish descent
Women autobiographers
1991 births
21st-century American women